Filimoni Vakalololma Bolavucu (born 13 February 1981 in Suva) is a Fijian rugby union player, who currently plays for Dax in Pro D2.  He plays as a wing. He played for the Suva Highlanders in the Colonial Cup. He also played for Lomaiviti in the local tournaments.  He has played in the Top 14 competition in France representing Brive and Bayonne.

Biography

He plays for the Lomaiviti in the Suva club competition and represented Suva Colts in 2000 and 2001. A superb performance in 2002 earned him a place in the senior Suva squad, and he also toured with the Fiji Under 21s to South Africa, playing in all five of Fiji's games.

As a 21-year-old, he represented Suva in the Sullivan-Farebrother 2002 challenge when they so nearly dethroned Naitasiri, and for Veiyanuyanu in the State of Origin match. Possessing much promise, Bolavucu attended both sets of national trials at Prince Charles Park in 2002 but did not quite break through to the Test side.

He made his Fiji 7s debut at the end of 2002, and was in the winning team at the 2002 South Africa 7s. His performances with the Fiji 7s team in 2003, however, won him a contract with Waikato for the NPC competition where he scored a try in the semi-final loss to Wellington.

After three years of provincial rugby in New Zealand, Bolavucu landed a job with French club Brive alongside Test fullback Norman Ligairi.

He was a key member of the triumphant Digicel Fiji 7s team of 2006, Bolavucu is one of the quickest in the Fiji squad.

Bolavucu made his Test debut for Fiji in 2007 against Australia A in their final game of the 2007 Pacific Nations Cup, Bolavucu scored two long range tries bringing Fiji to a 14 – 14 draw, the closest any of the 3 island nations came to beating Australia A in the Pacific Nations Cup.

After this performance he was selected for the 2007 Rugby World Cup, as one of three wingers ahead of stars Sireli Bobo and Rupeni Caucau, however he was ruled out due to injury without making an appearance and was replaced by Bobo.

He has signed to play for Dax for the 10/11 season.

References

External links
 
 Fiji profile
 

1981 births
Bay of Plenty rugby union players
Fiji international rugby union players
Fijian rugby union players
Living people
Rugby union wings
Fijian expatriate rugby union players
Expatriate rugby union players in France
Fijian expatriate sportspeople in France
Expatriate rugby union players in New Zealand
Fijian expatriate sportspeople in New Zealand
Fiji international rugby sevens players
Male rugby sevens players
Sportspeople from Suva
I-Taukei Fijian people
Commonwealth Games medallists in rugby sevens
Commonwealth Games bronze medallists for Fiji
Commonwealth Games rugby sevens players of Fiji
Rugby sevens players at the 2006 Commonwealth Games
Medallists at the 2006 Commonwealth Games